Lieutenant Colonel Nana Kofi Twumasi-Ankrah,  (born 1979) is a Ghanaian-born officer in the British Army.  Appointed by Queen Elizabeth II as her equerry, he was the first black man to hold this position. Twumasi-Ankrah is an officer of the Household Cavalry and a veteran of the war in Afghanistan and Iraq.

Early life and education

Nana Twumasi-Ankrah was born in Ghana in 1979 and moved to the United Kingdom with his parents in 1982 when he was three years old. His father is a former Head of Military Intelligence for the Ghanaian Army. He enrolled at Queen Mary University, London upon completion of his school education (where he was also a member of the University of London Officer Training Corps)  and then joined the Royal Military Academy Sandhurst. Twumasi-Ankrah was then commissioned in the Blues and Royals.

Working life

Twumasi-Ankrah was the first black African British Army officer to be commissioned directly into the Household Cavalry. He became known to the public in 2011 when he acted as escort commander at the Royal wedding of Prince William and Catherine Middleton and was seen alongside the 1902 State Landau in the carriage procession from Westminster Abbey to Buckingham Palace. Twumasi-Ankrah was appointed as commander of the Blues and Royals at the Trooping the Colour ceremony during the Queen's birthday celebrations the same year. He currently holds the military rank of lieutenant colonel.

Equerry appointment

In July 2017, Twumasi-Ankrah was named by Queen Elizabeth II as her equerry. The appointment made him the first black man to perform that role. He succeeded Wing Commander Sam Fletcher, who stepped down from the position in 2017. The equerry is considered one of the most important and senior positions in the royal household, requiring his attendance at official engagements at Buckingham Palace and other Royal residences. The position is reserved for an officer of one of the armed services and lasts for a period of three years.

At Windsor Castle on 27 November 2020, Twumasi-Ankrah was received by the Queen, who invested him with the MVO upon relinquishing his appointment as Equerry.

Personal life

On 2 June 2012, Twumasi-Ankrah married Joanna Hanna-Grindall, who is a senior corporate partnerships manager at the Victoria and Albert Museum. The couple have three children. He is known as TA amongst his Army colleagues. He is President of the Waterloo Branch of the Royal Society of Saint George.

References

1979 births
Living people
Alumni of Queen Mary University of London
Blues and Royals officers
British Army personnel of the Iraq War
British Army personnel of the War in Afghanistan (2001–2021)
Equerries
Ghanaian emigrants to England
Graduates of the Royal Military Academy Sandhurst
Members of the Royal Victorian Order